Wellington East may mean:
Wellington East (electoral district), was a provincial electoral district in the province of Ontario, Canada
Wellington East (New Zealand electorate), was a parliamentary electorate in the eastern suburbs of Wellington, New Zealand from 1887 to 1890 and from 1905 to 1946
9th (Wellington East Coast) Mounted Rifles, in New Zealand, was formed on 17 March 1911
Wellington East Girls' College, on the lower slopes of Mount Victoria, in New Zealand
Wellington East, South Australia, locality on the left bank of the lower reaches of the Murray River in Australia